Burning the Process is the major label debut album of alternative metal band Pressure 4-5, released on DreamWorks Records in 2001. It features 11 tracks, three of which ("These Hands," "Beat the World," and "Even Worse") were featured on a prior three-song sampler release and were re-recorded for this album. This would prove to be Pressure 4-5's first and only major label album, as the group disbanded in 2003.

Musical style 
Burning the Process showcases a sound akin to contemporary alternative metal as well as groups popular in the 1990s. In addition to a fierce scream, vocalist Adam Rich utilizes his voice comparably to Page Hamilton of Helmet. And while Rich insisted that their style falls under "heavy rock" rather than metal, and that the band "wanted to get as far away from the rap-rock scene as possible," tracks like "Even Worse" bear some resemblance to rap metal. In a 2002 interview, Rich said "It is sort of metal though we don’t really describe ourselves as metal. I think that we are a bit more hardcore than metal really, like New York style hardcore that is. We have a lot of people say that they hear a lot of things like Helmet and Quicksand."

Much of the album's lyrics deal with overcoming problems such as grieving and, particularly in the song "Even Worse," irrationality of religion. Frontman Adam Rich elaborated, "As individuals, we're constantly learning and trying to figure things out - it's an ongoing process. . . It's what life is about, and we named this record Burning The Process in honor of that."

Touring and promotion 
Pressure 4-5 acquired a spot on the Second Stage of Ozzfest 2001. Through the remainder of the year, they joined an MTV-sponsored club tour with groups like Alien Ant Farm and Hoobastank. The band also performed their own fourteen-date tour beginning March 31, 2002 before joining Lit on April 18. Next would be the MTV2 Presents Tour with Apex Theory and Lostprophets where they previewed new material.

"Beat the World," a song which deals with the sudden death of Adam Rich's best friend, would be the band's lead single off Burning the Process. Its music video, directed by Marc Webb, performed well on modern rock mainstays such as MTV2, and the song found considerable radio play from late summer to winter of 2001. "Beat the World" appeared on the WWF Tough Enough soundtrack in 2001.

In spring 2002, the group introduced their second single and video, "Melt Me Down." Rich explained the song as "[incorporating] the universal theme of having the freedom to express yourself however you want." The track was featured on the Tony Hawk's Pro Skater 3 soundtrack.

Critical reception 

Burning the Process was largely well received. Allmusic's Bradley Torreano noted the album's resurrection of mid '90s alternative metal and particularly obvious Helmet influence. He praised Rich's vocal abilities and the track "Stares" while noting "Even Worse" as one of "the only low points of an otherwise impressive debut." Torreano regarded the Burning the Process as demonstrating "a band with a lot of promise and ambition" and wide appeal.

Jessica Jardine of Daily Nexus also praised vocalist Adam Rich in her October 2001 review, stating he had "perfected the art of the catchy hook." However, she goes on to say "Moments exist when one longs for the band to let out its inner Korn and pop some eardrums. There are flashes in tracks like 'Stares' where one relishes hearing Rich tear apart his precious vocal chords as the band flies through charging guitar riffs."

DynamicRock gave Burning the Process 8.5 out of 10, labelling it "one of the year’s most riveting and unforgettable releases". They compared the album's sound to Onesidezero, Cold, Helmet and Quicksand, remarking, "Far removed from the aggro-driven, grunge-metal of Antechnology, Pressure 4-5’s major-label debut, Burning the Process, is an 11-track odyssey of passion, beauty, and artistic creativity. Combining thoughtfully crafted harmonics with emotionally-driven vocals, Pressure 4-5 has vastly improved as musicians." Gary Graff of Revolver considered it "a powerful debut, certainly a meaty dish that's served with a minimum of garnish-free of raps, loops, and samples." Metal Edge writer Mike Magnuson commended the lyrical purpose behind the album's tracks. Burning the Process also gained approval from smaller magazines including HITS and Mean Street who commended its "sense of melodic dynamics."

Track listing 
All music by Pressure 4-5.

Charts

Album

Singles

References

External links
 Pressure 4-5 at MTV.com
 "Beat the World" music video
 "Melt Me Down" music video

2001 debut albums
DreamWorks Records albums
Pressure 4-5 albums